The 1948–49 Drexel Dragons men's basketball team represented Drexel Institute of Technology during the 1948–49 men's basketball season. The Dragons, led by 3rd year head coach Ralph Chase, played their home games at Curtis Hall Gym and were members of the Southern division of the Middle Atlantic States Collegiate Athletic Conference (MASCAC).

During the end of the 1948–49 season, a new playoff system was implemented for the conference where the top 4 teams in the league standings would play in a tournament at the conclusion of the season.  In the first round, the 1st seed would play against the 3rd seed, and the 2nd seed would play against the 4th seed.  Following the tournament, if there was a tie between two teams leading the standings, a one game tiebreaker would be played to determine the league champion.

Roster

Schedule

|-
!colspan=9 style="background:#F8B800; color:#002663;"| Regular season
|-

References

Drexel Dragons men's basketball seasons
Drexel
1948 in sports in Pennsylvania
1949 in sports in Pennsylvania